Solargoppa is a village in Dharwad district of Karnataka, India.

Demographics 
As of the 2011 Census of India there were 157 households in Solargoppa and a total population of 863 consisting of 447 males and 416 females. There were 102 children ages 0-6.

References

Villages in Dharwad district